Syed Hasan or Hassan may refer to:

Syed Hasan (writer) (1908–1988), Indian writer and scholar
Syed Ainul Hasan (born 1957), Indian academic and university administrator
Syed Ali Hasan (before 1902–1962), Indian cricketer and police official
Syed Arif Hasan (born 1950), Pakistani sports administrator and retired general
Syed Hamidul Hasan, Indian ayatollah
Syed Mir Hassan (1844–1929), Indian scholar of the Qur'an, Hadith, Sufism, and Arabic
Syed Munawar Hasan (1941–2020), Pakistani politician
Syed Shamsul Hasan (1882–1981), Pakistani politician
Syed Sumail Hassan (born 1999), known as Sumail, Pakistani eSports player
Syed Wazir Hasan (1874–1947), Indian jurist and politician
Syed Zafarul Hasan (1885–1949), Pakistani philosopher